Metropolitan Gerasimos of San Francisco (born Gerasimos Michaleas; August 2, 1945) is a Greek Eastern Orthodox prelate who has served as the Metropolitan of San Francisco in the Greek Orthodox Church since 2005. 

His spiritual flock comprises 67 Greek Orthodox parishes in Hawaii, Alaska, Oregon, Washington, California, Nevada, and Arizona. He was elected to his office by the Sacred and Holy Synod of the Ecumenical Patriarchate on February 22, 2005 to succeed Metropolitan Anthony. He was enthroned at the Ascension Greek Orthodox Cathedral in Oakland, California on April 2, 2005 by Archbishop Demetrios.

Education 
Gerasimos Michaleas (born Kalamata, Greece) completed his primary and secondary education before emigrating for the United States.  He earned B.A and M.Div. degrees from Hellenic College/Holy Cross Greek Orthodox School of Theology  in Brookline, Massachusetts, in 1973 and 1976, respectively. He earned a master's Degree in counseling and school psychology from Boston College in 1986, and a doctorate in counseling and school psychology in 1993.

Prior ecclesiastical service 
Michaleas was ordained a deacon in 1979, and served as the archdeacon to Greek Orthodox Archbishop Iakovos until 1996.  He was elected by the Ecumenical Patriarchate as the titular bishop of Krateia in 2001, and served as the chief secretary of the Holy Eparchial Synod of the Greek Orthodox Archdiocese of America until his election to serve the metropolis of San Francisco.

Administrative experience  
He served in administrative positions for many years at Hellenic College/Holy Cross, where he was variously registrar (1977–1979), dean of students (1980–1999), director of admissions and records (1998–2000), and finally administrative assistant to the president of Hellenic College/Holy Cross (2000–2001), a post he held until his election as Bishop of Krateia in December, 2001.

Professional experience and academic achievements 
He taught courses in psychology at Hellenic College and in teleturgics (liturgical practice) at Holy Cross, and served as senior lecturer in personality and psychology at Northeastern University.  He was also member of the staff of the outpatient clinic of the V.A. Medical Center in Boston.  He is a member of the American Psychological Association and the American Counseling Association.  The University Press of America published his doctoral dissertation, Intellectual Deficiencies in a Substance Abuse Population, in 1994.

Ecumenical relations 
Gerasimos maintains cordial relations with other religious leaders as a member of the Holy Eparchial Synod of the Greek Orthodox Archdiocese of America (the chief ruling body of the Greek Orthodox churches in America,) the Canonical Bishops of the West Coast (i.e., Orthodox bishops,) and the Joint Committee of Orthodox And Catholic Bishops.

References

Official biography of Metropolitan Gerasimos from the Greek Orthodox Metropolis of San Francisco
GreekNews Greek-American Weekly Newspaper, article posted April 4, 2005, viewed February 22, 2008.
Worldwide Faith News  posting of Greek Orthodox Archdiocese of America press release. Viewed February 22, 2008. 
Greek Orthodox Church picks new leader for Western states, San Francisco Chronicle, February 23, 2005.  Viewed February 22, 2008.
Boston Theological Institute Spring 2002 newsletter, p 11. Viewed February 22, 2008.
Institute of Medicine, Psychology, and Religion. Viewed February 22, 2008.
Armenian Church 2007 Year in Review. Viewed February 22, 2008.
Meeting of the Canonical Bishops of the West Coast. Viewed February 22. 2008. 
Joint Committee of Orthodox and Catholic Bishops  meeting.  Viewed February 25, 2008.

1947 births
Living people
People from Kalamata
Hellenic College Holy Cross Greek Orthodox School of Theology alumni
Eastern Orthodoxy in California
Greek Orthodox Christians from the United States
21st-century Eastern Orthodox bishops
Eastern Orthodox metropolitans
Eastern Orthodox bishops in the United States
Religious leaders from the San Francisco Bay Area